"Down Deep Inside" is the theme song from the 1977 film The Deep. The film's score was written by British composer John Barry and the lyrics to the main theme were added by disco singer Donna Summer. The track was released as a single and became a hit in some European countries, including the U.K. The film soundtrack LP also contained a slower tempo version of the song, and an extended version of the original later appeared on a CD version of Summer's 1978 Live and More album. The song was nominated for a Golden Globe Award for Best Original Song.

Chart performance
The song was a hit on the US Dance Chart, as well as a top-five hit in the UK, and a top-ten hit in the Netherlands.

Charts

Certifications

References

1977 songs
1977 singles
Film theme songs
Donna Summer songs
Songs written by Donna Summer
Songs with music by John Barry (composer)
Songs written for films